Benjamin Richard Cox, OAM (born 13 December 1975)  is an Australian wheelchair basketball player. He was born in England.  He was part of the gold medal-winning Australia men's national wheelchair basketball team at the 1996 Summer Paralympics, for which he received a Medal of the Order of Australia.

References

Paralympic wheelchair basketball players of Australia
Paralympic gold medalists for Australia
Wheelchair category Paralympic competitors
Wheelchair basketball players at the 1996 Summer Paralympics
Recipients of the Medal of the Order of Australia
Living people
Medalists at the 1996 Summer Paralympics
1975 births
Paralympic medalists in wheelchair basketball